Zach Prince (born March 30, 1988 in Columbia, South Carolina) is a retired American soccer player who spent his entire professional career as a midfielder with the Charleston Battery in the United Soccer League. He is currently the head coach for New Mexico United.

Career

Youth and College
Prince grew up in Irmo, South Carolina and attended Irmo High School playing soccer all four years while also a member of the USYSA Region III Pool team in 2003 and 2005. He played four years of college soccer at the College of Charleston as a striker. During his college years Prince also played for Colorado Rapids U23's and Chicago Fire Premier in the USL Premier Development League, and was part of the Chicago squad which reached the 2009 PDL Championship game.

Professional
Prince signed his first professional contract with the Charleston Battery on April 14, 2010. He made his professional debut on April 17, 2010 in a 3-2 win over the Charlotte Eagles. He re-signed with the club for the 2012 season, his third, on January 13, 2012.

Prince played most commonly as an outside midfielder for the Battery, but also filled in at numerous other positions including right back and defensive midfield and was known for his competitive, physical style of play. Following the 2016 season Prince announced his retirement from professional soccer, finishing his USL career with 162 league appearances and 9 goals.

Managerial career

In 2019, Prince joined the New Mexico United organization as the first assistant to then-head coach, Troy Lesesne. In addition to the time spent in the senior side, he worked with the New Mexico United Academy in its inaugural season of 2021. On November 15, Prince was announced as the manager for the senior squad, replacing Troy Lesesne.

Honors

Charleston Battery
USL Second Division Regular Season Champions (1): 2010
USL Pro Champions (1): 2012

References

External links
 Charleston Battery bio

1988 births
Living people
American soccer players
College of Charleston Cougars men's soccer players
Colorado Rapids U-23 players
Chicago Fire U-23 players
Charleston Battery players
Soccer players from South Carolina
USL League Two players
USL Second Division players
USL Championship players
People from Irmo, South Carolina
Association football midfielders
New Mexico United coaches
USL Championship coaches